Michael David Glicksohn, better known as Mike Glicksohn (May 20, 1946 – March 18, 2011) was a Canadian high school math teacher and the co-editor of the science fiction fanzine Energumen with his then-wife Susan Wood (Glicksohn). Energumen won the 1973 Hugo Award for Best Fanzine, after having been nominated the two previous years Glicksohn was nominated for an individual Hugo in 1977.

He was born May 20, 1946, in Portsmouth, England, and died March 18, 2011, in Toronto, Ontario. He was a Guest of Honor at Aussiecon 1, the 33rd World Science Fiction Convention, in 1975.

References

External links
Downloadable Energumen archive
"If I Can't Be Great I'll Settle For Old" (autobiographical essay)
Special Mike Glicksohn Memorial Issue (#277) of Hugo-nominated fanzine The Drink Tank
"Remembering Mike Glicksohn" Patrick Nielsen Hayden Making Light March 20, 2011

1946 births
2011 deaths
Canadian schoolteachers
People from Toronto